The Talon Zipper company was the first zipper manufacturing company. It was founded in 1893 as the Universal Fastener Company, manufacturing hookless fasteners for shoes, but a move to Meadville, Pennsylvania led to it becoming the first manufacturer of zippers. The company flourished through the 1960s when it is estimated that seven out of every 10 zippers were Talon zippers [New York Times 12/7/1981].

History 

The Universal Fastener Company was founded in Chicago in 1893. It was later known as the Automatic Hook and Eye Company, and the Hookless Fastener Company, producing hookless fasteners for boots and shoes. The company later moved from Chicago to Hoboken, New Jersey, and finally to Meadville, Pennsylvania where the modern zipper was invented and where it began to be mass-produced in the 1920s. 

The high demand for zippers created favorable conditions for the Talon Company, and zippers became Meadville's most crucial industry. The company flourished through the 1960s when it is estimated that seven out of every 10 zippers were Talon zippers [New York Times 12/7/1981]. In 1968 the company was acquired by Textron industries and encountered significant difficulties competing with zippers manufactured abroad. By 1981 its market share had fallen to 35%, from its estimated 70% share in the 1960s.

The company was sold in 1981 to Nucon Holdings for 66 million dollars and production was shifted to Mexico, but to no avail, and it was sold to private Mexican investors. In 1996 it was acquired by Tag-It Pacific, a company based in California, which changed its corporate name in 2007 to Talon International, Inc., and shifted production to Asia in an attempt to restore the company's fortunes.

Products

Zippers 
 Metal
 Vintage Zips
 DrXTalon
 Bottom Jean Zippers
 Workwear : Work Zip
 FR Zip, Flame Resistant
 Plastic Molded
 Coil
 Electroplated Coil
 Water Resistant: AquaTight Water Resistant coil zippers
 KidZip
 FootZip

Trims 
Talon International pioneered the creation and implementation of complex trim outsourcing programs for large apparel manufacturers. 
 Paper Marketing
 Labels
 Metal Fasteners
 Patches
 Heat Seals
 Tapes/Cords
 Packaging

Tekfit 

Tekfit is Talon's newest division. Tekfit incorporates the patented creation of stretch technology into complex garment solutions to create stretchable waistbands, collar stands, and more for major apparel manufacturers worldwide. Utilizing a unique patented process, garment manufacturers can now transform standard non-flexible fabrics into remarkable fabrics able to stretch, expand and then recover back to its original size.

Distribution 
Talon zippers are used primarily by manufacturers in the apparel industry and are distributed through their distribution facilities in the United States, Europe, Hong Kong and China and through these designated offices to other international markets, including Taiwan, India, Bangladesh, Indonesia, Vietnam, Dominican Republic and Central America.

COVID-19 support 
In April 2020, Talon International retrofitted its manufacturing facilities to provide medical and non-medical staff with Personal Protective Equipment (PPE). Talon supplies 3-ply face masks and face shields of medical grade, as well as cloth masks, gloves, alcohol wipes, hand sanitizers, and gowns for insulation. A part of PPE 's proceeds from the sales were to be donated to the organization Feeding America.

See also
 Gideon Sundback
 Zipper
 Meadville, Pennsylvania

References

External links
Official Talon Zipper website
Official DrXTalon website

Clothing companies of the United States
Manufacturing companies based in Pennsylvania
Meadville, Pennsylvania
American companies established in 1893
Manufacturing companies established in 1893